This article contains all out of services arms and equipment used by the Lebanese Armed Forces since its early foundation. The items are arrange in categories according to the branch they are used in.

Ground Force

Air Force

Navy

See also
 List of equipment of the Lebanese Armed Forces
 Weapons of the Lebanese Civil War

References

Military equipment of Lebanon
Lebanon